In enzymology, an acyl-phosphate-hexose phosphotransferase is an enzyme that catalyzes the chemical reaction

acyl phosphate + D-hexose  an acid + D-hexose phosphate

Thus, the two substrates of this enzyme are acyl phosphate and D-hexose, whereas its two products are acid and D-hexose phosphate.

This enzyme belongs to the family of transferases, specifically those transferring phosphorus-containing groups (phosphotransferases) with an alcohol group as acceptor.  The systematic name of this enzyme class is acyl-phosphate:D-hexose phosphotransferase. This enzyme is also called hexose phosphate:hexose phosphotransferase.

References

 
 

EC 2.7.1
Enzymes of unknown structure